George Walter Kemp is an American former Negro league catcher who played in the 1940s.

Kemp played for the New York Black Yankees in 1943. In 22 recorded games, he posted 11 hits in 70 plate appearances.

References

External links
 and Baseball-Reference Black Baseball Stats and Seamheads

Year of birth missing
Place of birth missing
New York Black Yankees players
Baseball catchers